Chandrakant Raju (born 7 March 1954) is an Indian computer scientist, mathematician, educator, physicist and polymath. He received the Telesio Galilei Academy Award in 2010 for defining a product of Schwartz distributions, for proposing an interpretation of quantum mechanics, dubbed the structured-time interpretation, and a model of physical time evolution, and for proposing the use of functional differential equations in physics.

Early life and education
Raju was born on 7 March 1954 in  Gwalior, Madhya Pradesh, India. He obtained a B.Sc. degree from the Institute of Science, Bombay (1973), an M.Sc. from the Department of Mathematics University of Mumbai, Bombay (1975), and a Ph.D. at the Indian Statistical Institute (1980).

Career 
During the early 1980s, he was a faculty member at the Department of Statistics, University of Pune. Raju was a key contributor to the first Indian supercomputer, PARAM (1988–91),

Raju has also done considerable historical research, most notably claiming infinitesimal calculus was transmitted to Europe from India.

Raju built on E.T. Whittaker's beliefs that Albert Einstein's theories of special and general relativity built on the earlier work of Henri Poincaré. Raju claims that they were "remarkably similar", and every aspect of special relativity was published by Poincaré in papers between 1898 and 1905. Raju goes further, saying that Einstein's failure to recognise the need for functional differential equations constitute a mistake that underlies subsequent relativistic physics. He proposes that relativistic physics must be reformulated using functional differential equations.  

Through his research, Raju has claimed that the Western philosophy of science, including its aspects that pertain to time  and the nature of mathematical proof are rooted in the theocratic needs of the Roman Catholic Church.

He has authored 12 books and dozens of articles, mainly on the subjects of physics, mathematics, and the history and philosophy of science.

Bibliography

References

Further reading

External links
 C.K. Raju's Website
 On Google scholar - His work on Statistics
 On Google scholar - His work on Physics

20th-century Indian physicists
1954 births
Living people
People from Gwalior
Scientists from Madhya Pradesh